In the late 20th and early 21st centuries, a number of countries have passed laws aimed at reducing discrimination against people with disabilities. These laws have begun to appear as the notion of civil rights has become more influential globally, and follow other forms of anti-discrimination and equal opportunity legislation aimed at preventing racial discrimination and sexism which began to emerge in the second half of the 20th century. Many of these Acts aim to reduce barriers for persons with disabilities in the areas of customer service, employment, built environment, transportation, and information and communications.

List of disability discrimination acts
Australia: Disability Discrimination Act 1992
 Cambodia: Law on the Protection and the Promotion of the Rights of Persons with Disabilities

 Canada: Ontarians with Disabilities Act (2002), The Accessibility for Manitobans Act (2013)
 Ghana: Persons with Disability Act, 2006 
 Hong Kong : Disability Discrimination Ordinance 1995 (see Disability Discrimination Act 1995 below)
 Jamaica: Disabilities Act, 2014 
 Nigeria: Discrimination Against Persons with Disabilities (Prohibition) Act 2018
 Pakistan: National Policy for Persons with Disabilities 2002
 South Africa: Promotion of Equality and Prevention of Unfair Discrimination Act, 2000
 United Kingdom: Equality Act 2010 (prior to October 2010 the relevant legislation was the Disability Discrimination Act 1995 as amended)
 United States of America: Americans with Disabilities Act of 1990
 South Korea: Prohibition of Discrimination Against Persons with Disabilities, 2008

See also

Ableism
Equal opportunity

References

Disability legislation
Anti-discrimination legislation